Prasinohaema (Greek: "green blood") is a genus of skinks characterized by having green blood.  This condition is caused by an excess buildup of the bile pigment biliverdin.
 Prasinohaema species have plasma biliverdin concentrations approximately 1.5-30 times greater than fish species with green blood plasma and 40 times greater than humans with green jaundice. The benefit provided by the high pigment concentration is unknown, but one possibility is that it protects against malaria.

Geographic range
Species in the genus Prasinohaema are endemic to New Guinea and the Solomon Islands.

Species
Species in the genus include:
Prasinohaema flavipes  – common green tree skink
Prasinohaema parkeri  – Parker's green tree skink
Prasinohaema prehensicauda  – prehensile green tree skink
Prasinohaema semoni  – Semon's green tree skink
Prasinohaema virens  - green-blooded skink, green tree skink

Nota bene: A binomial authority in parentheses indicates that the species was originally described in a genus other than Prasinohaema.

Etymology
The specific names, parkeri and semoni, are in honor of English herpetologist Hampton Wildman Parker and German zoologist Richard Wolfgang Semon, respectively.

References

Further reading
Greer AE (1974). "The genetic relationships of the Scincid lizard genus Leiolopisma and its relatives". Australian J. Zool. Supplementary Series 22 (31): 1-67. (Prasinohaema, new genus, p. 12).

External links
Prasinohaema in the Reptile Database.
Green Blood episode in O'Shea's Big Adventure.

Prasinohaema
Lizard genera
Endemic fauna of New Guinea
Skinks of New Guinea
Taxa named by Allen Eddy Greer